Extras (The Mango People) is a 2011 Pakistani sitcom. The show is directed by Danish Nawaz and produced by Anila Danish. It aired on Hum TV every Saturday at 7:30 PM starring Danish Nawaz. The first episode was shown on 11 June 2011.

Cast 
 Danish Nawaz
 Fatima Effendi
 Anoushay Abbasi as Fouzia
 Ayeza Khan as Episodic appearance
 Humayoun Ashraf as Kami
 Faiza Hasan as Shakeela
 Ali Rizvi
 Parveen Akbar as Amma Ji
 Faheem Abbas
 Ismail Tara as Hira's father
 Anum Fayyaz as Hira
 Rubina Arif as Samina
 Kamran Jilani
 Ashraf Khan
 Benita David
 Saleem Mairaj
 Nayyar Ejaz
 Gul-e-Rana
 Syed Jibran
 Mehwish Hayat

References

External links 
 

2011 Pakistani television series debuts
Urdu-language television shows
Pakistani television sitcoms
Hum TV original programming